Junghuhnia collabens is a species of fungus belonging to the family Steccherinaceae.

It has cosmopolitan distribution.

References

Steccherinaceae